Pombhurna is a town and a tehsil in Chandrapur subdivision of Chandrapur district in Nagpur revenue Division in the Berar region in the state of Maharashtra, India. Earlier it was under Gondpimpari Taluka.

References

Cities and towns in Chandrapur district
Talukas in Maharashtra